The 43rd edition of the annual Vuelta a Venezuela was held from August 28 to September 10, 2006. The stage race started in Guasdualito, and ended in Maturín.

Stages

2006-08-28: Circuito Guasdualito (114 km)

2006-08-29: Abejales — Barinas (202.2 km)

2006-08-30: Barinas — Acarigua (189.4 km)

2006-08-31: Turén — Turén (47.5 km)

2006-09-01: Acarigua — Sanare (143.5 km)

2006-09-02: Chivacoa — Maracay (200.4 km)

2006-09-03: Caracas Circuito (111.6 km)

2006-09-04: Los Teques — San Juan de los Morros (146 km)

2006-09-05: Ortiz — Valle de la Pascua (163 km)

2006-09-06: Valle de la Pascua — El Tigre (223 km)

2006-09-07: El Tigre — Puerto la Cruz (171.3 km)

2006-09-08: Puerto la Cruz — Cumaná (132.2 km)

2006-09-09: Cumaná — Punta de Mata (173.3 km)

2006-09-10: Maturín Circuito, (112 km)

Final classification

References 
 live-radsport
 cyclingnews

Vuelta a Venezuela
Venezuela
Vuelta Venezuela